Anydros is a Greek island in the municipality of Santorini, which is a group of islands in the Cyclades. It is north of the island Anafi, and southwest of Amorgos.

Islands of Greece
Cyclades
Landforms of Thira (regional unit)
Islands of the South Aegean